Michael Richardson may refer to:

Sports

Gridiron football
Mike Richardson (American football, born 1961), former professional American football player of the 1980s
Mike Richardson (American football, born 1984), professional American football player
Mike Richardson (running back, born 1946), American football player
Mike Richardson (running back, born 1969), former professional Canadian football player

Other sports
Mike Richardson (Australian footballer) (born 1959), former Australian rules footballer
Mike Richardson (soccer) (born 1985), American professional soccer player who plays as a midfielder
Michael Richardson (English footballer) (born 1992), English professional footballer who plays as a midfielder
Michael Richardson (cricketer) (born 1986), South African born English cricketer

Other
Michael Richardson (politician) (born 1949), Australian politician
Mike Richardson (publisher) (born 1950), publisher of Dark Horse Comics
Michael Richardson (investment banker) (1925–2003), British investment banker

See also
Micheal Ray Richardson (born 1955), American basketball coach and former player
Micheál Richardson, American actor
Mick Richardson (1874–1920), English footballer active in the 1890s